Olea brachiata grows as a shrub or small tree up to  tall, with a stem diameter of up to . The twigs are pale brown. The flowers are dull white. Fruit ripens to purple-black. The specific epithet brachiata is from the Latin meaning "branched", referring to the decussate inflorescence. O. brachiata is native to China, Thailand, Cambodia, Vietnam, Malaysia and Indonesia.

References

brachiata
Flora of China
Flora of Indo-China
Flora of Malesia
Plants described in 1790
Lamiales of Asia